Holbæk Bold- & Idrætsforening is a Danish football club currently playing in 2. Division East. They play at Holbæk Stadion in Holbæk on Zealand, which has a capacity of 10,500.

From 2008 to 2014 their first team played under the name Nordvest FC.

History 

The club was founded in 1931 by the merging of Holbæk Idrætsforening and Holbæk Boldklub, after a period where Holbæk Idrætsforening had some success in regional championships. The quality of the team had declined, however, since the year 1924 where some members broke out to found Holbæk Boldklub. The reason among others for that move being that cricket was still a part of the club's activities. But on 4 August 1931 the two clubs in the rather small town decided to become one – leaving cricket on the side line.

After a long period of mediocrity the club began to rise in the 1960s, where the best team was promoted several times and ended up the Danish premier division in 1974. The 1970s turned out to be the best decade for the club ever, in which the team was the runner-up in the league once going to the cup final twice; without winning. In spite of the fact that the club did not win a title, it gained huge local popularity and fostered a couple of players for the national team.

The 1980s and 1990s however saw a steady decline for the club and in 1993 it was to be found in what was then the 6th best league in the country. From there on, things started to improve and the club won some promotions during the next decade. It was for the last few seasons among the top teams in the third best league, but in the 2007–2008 season this run came to an abrupt end with a disastrous season ending in relegation from the 2nd division. On 1 July 2008, the club – in an attempt to attract better sponsors and achieve a higher degree of professionalism, was divided in a semi-professional wing called Nordvest FC and the amateur side retaining the Holbæk B&I name.

Following economic difficulties in the 2013–14 season the professional structure, Nordvest FC, was dissolved and the first team of the club in the Danish 2nd Division East went back to the name Holbæk B&I.

Honours 
Danish Championship
 Runner-up (1): 1975
Danish Cup
 Runner-up (2): 1975, 1976
Zealand Series
 Winner (3): 1936–37, 1974‡, 1998‡
 Runners-up (3): 1947–48, 1961, 1995

‡: Won by reserve team

Achievements
4 seasons in the Highest Danish League
10 seasons in the Second Highest Danish League
24 seasons in the Third Highest Danish League

Notable players 

Holbæk B&I have had 5 players selected for the Danish national team: Torben Hansen, Allan Hansen, Jørgen Jørgensen, Niels Tune-Hansen, and Benno Larsen. All of them played for the club in its 1970s heyday. Later on, the club has been the breeding ground for Kurt Jørgensen and Christian Poulsen, who also played for the national team. The latter has, in the first decade of the 2000s (decade), become the most successful former Holbæk player ever, with his transfers to F.C. Copenhagen, Schalke 04 in Germany, Sevilla in 2006, Juventus in 2008 and Liverpool in 2010.

References

External links
Official site (in Danish)
Årsbogen (in Danish)

 
Football clubs in Denmark
1931 establishments in Denmark
Association football clubs established in 1931
Holbæk